Henry Charles Beck (4 June 190218 September 1974) was an English technical draughtsman who created the present London Underground Tube map in 1931. Beck drew the diagram after being fired at the London Metro Signal Office. Although his design was initially rejected, the Publicity Office of London Transport changed their minds after Beck resubmitted an updated copy and the map was first issued a pocket edition in January 1933. It was immediately popular, and the Underground has used topological maps to illustrate the network ever since. Harry Beck wanted to make the network easier to understand by colouring each train route and using straight lines and 45 degree angles.

London Underground map

Before Beck 

Prior to the Beck diagram (the underground map that he created), the various underground lines had been laid out geographically, often superimposed over the roadway of a city map. This meant the centrally located stations were shown very close together and the out-of-town stations spaced far apart. From around 1909 a new type of 'map' appeared inside the train cars; it was a non-geographic linear diagram, in most cases a simple straight horizontal line, which equalized the distances between stations. 

By the late 1920s most Underground lines and some mainline (especially LNER) services displayed these, many of which had been drawn by George Dow. Some writers and broadcasters have speculated that Dow's maps partly inspired Beck's work. The geographical-based map, used immediately prior to Beck, in 1932, was produced by the underground map designer for the period 1926–1932, F. H. Stingemore. It was Stingemore's idea to slightly expand the central area of the map for ease of reading.

Beck's concept 

It was however, Beck who had the idea of creating a full system map in colour. He believed that Underground passengers were not concerned with geographical accuracy and were more interested in how to get from one station to another and where to change trains. While drawing an electrical circuit diagram, Beck came up with a new idea for a map that was based upon the concept of an electrical schematic on which all the stations were more-or-less equally spaced rather than a geographic map. Beck first submitted his idea to Frank Pick of London Underground in 1931 but it was considered too radical because it did not show distances relative from any one station to the others. The design was therefore rejected by the Publicity department at first, but the designer persisted. So, after a successful trial of 500 copies in 1932, distributed via a few select stations, the map was given its first full publication in 1933 (700,000 copies). The positive reaction from customers proved it was a sound design, and a large reprint was required after only one month.

It is suggested by Degani (2013) that one of the configuration techniques employed by Beck was that of an "underlying grid". In some cases the vertical and horizontal grid units are equalised, but on the whole the grid is rectilinear. The result is a "relaxed grid ... which has a certain rhythm and charm – somewhat similar to the grid used by modern artists (e.g. Piet Mondrian's painting Composition With Yellow, Blue and Red, 1937–42.)"

The map after Beck 

Beck tried to regain control of the map, threatening legal action until 1965,  "bitter and betrayed by the very organisation he had helped, so admirably, to promote."

In 1997, Beck's importance was posthumously recognised, and currently (2022) the statement 'This diagram is an evolution of the original design conceived in 1931 by Harry Beck' is printed on every London Underground map.

Design Icon 
As part of the Transported by Design programme of activities, on 15 October 2015, after two months of public voting, Harry Beck's tube map was elected by Londoners as number 3 of the 10 favourite transport design icons.

Other works 
In 1938 he produced a diagram of the entire rail system of the London region (as far as St Albans in the north, Ongar in the north east, Romford in the east, Bromley in the south east, Mitcham in the south, Hinchley Wood in the south west, Ashford in the west, and Tring in the north west). It included both the Underground and mainlines. It was not published at the time but was seen in Ken Garland's book, first published in 1994; it took until 1973 until any official attempt was made to replicate a rail diagram for the entire London region.

Beck produced at least one map for British Railways. After nationalisation, the Eastern Region commissioned Beck to produce a map of the suburban lines out of Marylebone, King's Cross, Liverpool Street and Fenchurch Street, similar in scope to earlier maps produced by George Dow for the London & North Eastern Railway.

Beck produced at least two versions of a diagram for the Paris Métro. The project, which Beck was never commissioned to do, may have been begun, according to Ken Garland, as early as before the start of World War II. A version dating from approximately 1946 is published in Garland's book. His second version is published for the first time in Mark Ovenden's book about the Paris Métro.

Recognition 

According to some accounts, Beck was never formally commissioned to develop his initial idea and worked on the map only in his spare time. He was thus never actually paid for the map. Other sources report that he was paid a fee of five or ten guineas.

London Regional Transport created the Beck gallery at the London Transport Museum in the early 1990s, where his works are displayed. A commemorative plaque was installed at Finchley Central Underground station. Beck's home at 60 Court House Road, Finchley was marked with a plaque by the Finchley Society in 2003.

In March 2006 viewers of BBC2's The Culture Show and visitors to London's Design Museum voted Harry Beck's Tube map as their second-favourite British design of the 20th century in the Great British Design Quest. The winner was Concorde.

GB Railfreight named locomotive 66721 after Beck in January 2007.

In January 2009 the Royal Mail included Beck's map when it issued a set of postage stamps celebrating British design classics.

In March 2013 a blue plaque was unveiled on the house where Beck was born, in Wesley Road in Leyton, to mark the 80th anniversary of the Tube map.

References

Further reading

External links 
Harry Beck's Original Tube Map
Early Sketch by Beck of his new London Underground map from the V&A website
London Transport Museum official website
Transport for London's London Tube map (December 2020(d))

1902 births
1974 deaths
British graphic designers
Information graphic designers
People associated with transport in London
Transport design in London
Academics of the London College of Communication
People from Leyton